Michael J. Redenbach (born 3 June 1959) is a former Australian rules footballer who played with Essendon in the Victorian Football League (VFL).

Redenbach, a Tasmanian from Burnie, played just three games for Essendon. He appeared against Carlton, Footscray and North Melbourne in the 1978 VFL season.

A rover, he played with City-South and East Launceston in the NTFA in the late 1970s and early 1980s, and with Werribee in the mid 1980s, being club captain in 1984 and 1985.

References

1959 births
Australian rules footballers from Tasmania
Essendon Football Club players
Burnie Football Club players
Werribee Football Club players
City-South Football Club players
East Launceston Football Club players
Living people